Kid Detectives is an Australian children's TV program shown on the Seven Network. The show uncovers forensic mysteries in a way that is educational and fun to children and began airing on 7 August 2009. The program is hosted by Stephen Multari and Shae Brewster. The series is based on the book Crime Scene Detectives published by Dorling Kindersley.

Kid Detectives use hands-on forensic skills to solve mysteries big and small at home. Kids become forensic super sleuths by following the do-it-yourself activities at home. Kids learn to assess and reconstruct a crime scene, collate evidence, analyse clues and eliminate suspects.

See also

List of Australian television series

References

External links 
Kid Detectives at Beyond Television Productions

2009 Australian television series debuts
Australian children's television series
Television series by Beyond Television Productions